Tara International, a subsidiary of Bengal Enamal, located in Mumbai, India, is the marketer for Tara Green Auto, a producer of battery electric vehicles to include two, three and four wheel designs.

Tara S. Ganguly is the current Managing Director.

Products

 Electric bicycles/electric scooters/Electric ATVs
 DY09A3A
 DY09B2
 A-27
 BL 2021
 A32B
 A50B
 S56B
 DZ01E
 T01
 T02
 S66D
 ATV
 BEV Trikes
 XF250ZK3A
 XF250ZK3
 BEV Cars, proposes to import 60-70% components from China and manufacture the remainder in India.
 Tara Titu
 Tara Tiny
 Tara Quiet
 Buses (up to 52 seats)
 TARA 6120
 TARA 6791
 TARA 6840
 Commercial vehicles (Golfcarts)
 DV32051(0.5)
 DV32102(1)
 DV32155(1.5)
 DV32206(2)
 DV32306(3)

Retrofitting

Tara will remove the existing petrol, diesel, CNG, or LPG engine and put the EV motor and batteries in most vehicles, Depends on the vehicle's condition.

References

External links
 Official site

Companies based in Mumbai
Car manufacturers of India
Bus manufacturers of India
Battery electric vehicle manufacturers
Electric vehicle manufacturers of India
Companies with year of establishment missing